General elections were held in Burma between 4 and 18 October 1981. The country was a one-party state at the time, with the Burma Socialist Programme Party as the sole legal party. It therefore won all 475 seats in People's Assembly.

Results

References

1981 in Burma
Elections in Myanmar
Burma
One-party elections
Election and referendum articles with incomplete results